Babahoyo, founded May 27, 1948, by legislative decree, is the capital of the Los Ríos province of Ecuador. Its population is cited around 153,000.  It is bordered by two rivers, the San Pablo and the Caracol, which join to form the Babahoyo River. This meets the Daule River to form the Guayas River, which runs to the Pacific Ocean at the Gulf of Guayaquil.

A processing and trade center for the surrounding agricultural region, the city handles rice, sugarcane, fruits, balsa wood, and tagua nuts (vegetable ivory). Rice and sugar are also milled here.

Geography

The city is located in on the left bank of the San Pablo River, which unites in its estuary with the Catarama River to form the Babahoyo River. One of the most interesting excursions one can take in the area is a boat trip on the Babahoyo River. Babahoyo is located in Litoral and is an obligatory stop to reach the mountains through the highways Babahoyo – Quito (Via Panamericana), Babahoyo – Ambato (Via Flores) and also through Babahoyo – Riobamba. Babahoyo is located in the south of the province of Los Ríos. The roads that unite it with other cities and towns in the coast are Babhoyo – Baba, Babahoyo – Guayaquil and Babahoyo – Milagro. Its geographical location is one of the best because more than 25000 cars, buses, trailers and trucks pass through Babahoyo every day. Babhoyo is a commercial center between the coast and the mountains. Through the urban road network, the city counts on two pedestrian bridges that permit communication between Barreiro and El Salto. There are four bridges for vehicles: the first two cross the Catarama River and the San Pablo river in the north of the city (highway Babahoyo – Quito); the third crosses the Lagarto marsh in the south of the city (highway Babahoyo – Guayaquil); and the fourth is located in the sector of La Ventura (highway Babahoyo – Ambato).

Climate 
The city has a hot and humid climate.  Babahoyo floods frequently during the winter months.  (Note:Babahoyo flooded during January–June 2008 in which the entire city flooded)

History

The city of Babahoyo was founded on May 27, 1869 in the lands ceded by the Flores family. Facing the confluence of the Babahoyo River and Caracol River, the city was established on the right bank of the San Pablo River. For a long time it was called Bodegas (warehouses) because the customs and royal stores were located in the city, to control the commerce between Guayaquil and the cities of the Ecuadorian mountains.

Babahoyo suffered from many fires, the worst one occurring on March 30, 1867, which demolished all of the goods of the population, creating a sufficient motive for the government of Dr. Gabriel García Moreno to move the city to its current location. The capital was moved to the other side of the San Pablo River, where the urban district of Barreiro is now located.

It is a prototype of the activity and height of different orders of national life, and will continue to be so, because it has its own resources; it is the backbone of two regions: coast and mountains; being the most influential point in between the two, where the forces of many enterprising villages are bonded; because here the agricultural and commercial aspirations were founded.

Demographics
Babahoyo has a population of 153,000 inhabitants in the city center, which is one of the largest of the region. It is one of the 10 biggest cities of the country. A large part of its population is in the urban area and in the outskirts of the city which are near the Bypass (Via E25, highway Babahoyo – Quito) that passes through all of the city from the south to the northeast. The center of the city begins at Malecón 9 de octubre, and includes the roads Juan x Marcos Isaías Chopitea and ends at Primero de Mayo. This is the center for commerce and public administration. The center has all infrastructure services and a large part of the community centers of the city; the buildings of this sector are built with strong, modern materials. The roads are in good repair, all with strong paving and some paved with flexible asphalt.

Economy

The population is mainly dedicated to farming and the common crops are rice and bananas. Different industries have taken root in this city such as Industrias Facundo located in the periphery of the city, and also the Ingenio Isabel Maria, the fourth largest refinery in the country, and different (piladoras); a large part of the city is upwardly mobile above all in the city center which is the largest economic center in the province. There are also a few different banking entities.

Culture

The patron saint’s day is 24 September. Each year Babahoya gives just homage to the Virgin of Merced in the following manner: from the 15th until 23 September, different groups carry the Virgin through the streets of the city. On the 24th the day of September Merced is celebrated. Artisans of the mountain and coastal regions of Ecuador show and sell their wares, and there is always a large fair of children's toys. Folkloric groups and national and sometimes international singers come to give homage to the Virgin.

Attractions
Noteworthy attractions of the capital include the verdant gardens of Parque 24 de Mayo and the city's main cathedral, which is decorated with an enormous mosaic mural depicting the Virgin Mary.

One of the excursions that the area offers involves sailing down the Rio Babahoyo, taking in the countryside and the traditional lifestyle of the area's campesinos who live off the land, cultivating crops and raising cattle.  One feature of this journey that stands out is seeing the floating houses unique to the area.

Local Festivals
Within the local festivals and holidays that Babahoyans celebrate are the following:

Food

In Babahoyo the main dish is the ceviche of shrimp, fish and conch.  Another characteristic dish famous in Babahoyo is the caldo de manguera (sausage soup).

Transportation 
Most bus companies running between Quito and Guayaquil stop or pass through Babahoyo. Quevedo connects with Guayaquil by two highways, a less popular one through Balzar and Daule, and one that passes through Babahoyo.

Babahoyo has two Transportation Agencies: Fluminense and The Santa Ana Cooperative. There are 5 bus routes and each of these go from the northeast to the south passing through the city center. There is also transportation by boat which joins the urban parishes of Barreiro and El Salto and the rural parishes of Pimocha and Caracol.

Rural Districts

La Unión 
Located in the northwest of Babahoyo, close to the mountains, is an agricultural district which is dedicated to fishing and rice, soy and banana cultivation.

Pimocha 
It is a very large district in regards to area. It borders Puebloviejo county in the north, the Babahoyo River in the south, the Caracol River in the east, and the Garrapata River in the west. Its precincts are Cauge, Guarumo, Chapulo, Convento, Mapan, Sauce, Gallinazo, Papayal, Compañía, Pechiche Dulce, Santa Rita, Las tres bocas, Calabria, Cubon de Caimito, Parindero, Río Grande, Tejar, Providencia, etc. It is certain that it was home to many tribes that formed the Huancavilca villages.

The main source of work and wealth is agriculture although some other industries exist. The ground produces cocoa, rice, sugar cane, coffee, rubber, fine wood, especially oak, cedar and balsa wood. Bananas are exported in large quantities. Also pineapple, sapote, and many wild fruits grow here. Extensive industries other than livestock and fishery are sugar factories and liquor production and rice and coffee farming.

Caracol 

It is one of the oldest populations. Perhaps like Ojivarm it was the location of an indigenous tribe that the Spanish encountered during their expedition in these lands. In 1838 the population was raised to a category of an ecclesiastical parrish, making it independent of the curate of Babahoyo. It borders Catarma in the north, Barriero in the south, Montalvo in the east and is separated from Pimocha in the west by the Caracol River.

Febres Cordero 

Created in Recinto de Las Juntas on May 14, 1936, its inhabitants are farmers and ranchers. Febres Cordero is one of the most important agricultural centres of the city.

External links 

  Official Website of Babahoyo (Spanish)

 
Populated places in Los Ríos Province
Provincial capitals in Ecuador
Populated places established in 1796
1796 establishments in the Spanish Empire